King of the River is a 1995 Spanish drama film directed by Manuel Gutiérrez Aragón. It was entered into the 45th Berlin International Film Festival.

Cast
 Alfredo Landa as Antón Costa
 Carmen Maura as Carmen
 Gustavo Salmerón as César
 Ana Álvarez as Ana
 Achero Mañas as Fernando
 Miriam Fernández as Elena (as Miriam Ubri)
 Sílvia Munt as Elisa
 Héctor Alterio as Juan
 Cesáreo Estébanez as Corcones
 Gerardo Vera as Bergasa
 Francis Lorenzo as Marco

References

External links

1995 films
Spanish drama films
1990s Spanish-language films
1995 drama films
Films directed by Manuel Gutiérrez Aragón
1990s Spanish films